Morad Mameri better known by his stage name DJ Mam's born in Marseille, France, in 1972 is a Marseille-based French DJ of Algerian descent. He is signed to Wagram music label.

Career
Mameri was born in Marseille to Algerian immigrants and started playing at immigrant community events. In 2007, he released his first album Mam's Mix Party and was active in organizing many music events.

Collectif 123 Marseille
In 2009, DJ Mam's turned his attention to incorporating various music trends Marseille culture represented and the result was his founding of Collectif 123 Marseille.

Discography

Albums

Singles

*Did not appear in the official Belgian Ultratop 50 charts, but rather in the bubbling under Ultratip charts.

References

External links
Site Officiel
Youtube
Facebook
Twitter
Myspace

French DJs
1972 births
Living people
French people of Algerian descent
Musicians from Marseille